Albert Richard Henry Howe (born 16 November 1938) is an English, retired professional footballer who played as a defender in The Football League.

Career
Born in Charlton, London, Howe made 313 league appearances for Crystal Palace, Leyton Orient and Colchester United, before moving into non-league football with Romford.

References

External links
 

1938 births
Association football defenders
English footballers
Faversham Town F.C. players
Crystal Palace F.C. players
Leyton Orient F.C. players
Colchester United F.C. players
Romford F.C. players
English Football League players
Living people
Footballers from Charlton, London
Cray Wanderers F.C. players